Lamprus or Lampros ( "shining", "distinguished" or "munificent") may refer to:

Ancient Greece
 Lamprus of Erythrae or Lamprus of Athens, fifth-century BC music teacher
Lamprus, the father of Leucippus.

Biology
 Lampros, a taxonomic synonym for the moth genus Orophia

See also
 , the Modern Greek form of the name (sometimes written Lampros)
 Lambro